Harry Joe Enten (born March 1, 1988) is an American journalist known for his former role as a senior political writer and analyst for the website FiveThirtyEight and his current job as a senior writer and analyst for CNN Politics. He was described by the Columbia Journalism Review as being of a new generation of political journalists, focusing on data-driven journalism instead of reporting from the campaign trail.

Early life and education
Enten was raised in a Jewish family in the Riverdale neighborhood of The Bronx, New York City. Harry was introduced to politics as a child when his father, a judge, took him into the polling booth to help pull the levers for elections. He attended Riverdale Country School. He is the nephew-in-law, by marriage, of singer-songwriter Neil Sedaka.

Enten graduated magna cum laude, and Phi Beta Kappa from Dartmouth College in 2011. Enten chose to attend Dartmouth at least partially due to New Hampshire's status as the first-in-the-nation primary.

Enten began publishing a blog called Margin of Error, and held an internship at NBC News Political Unit in Washington, D.C. Prior to working for FiveThirtyEight, Enten was a journalist for The Guardian.

FiveThirtyEight
Along with Carl Bialik and Walter Hickey, Enten was one of the first people Nate Silver hired when FiveThirtyEight relaunched under ESPN. He mostly wrote politics articles for FiveThirtyEight, but he occasionally wrote weather pieces. Enten was also one of the co-hosts of the FiveThirtyEight politics podcast, alongside host Jody Avirgan and fellow co-hosts Nate Silver and Clare Malone.

He announced on February 5, 2018 that he was leaving FiveThirtyEight to join CNN's Politics team as a senior political writer and analyst.

The Forecast Fest
From April 2019 to March 2020 Kate Bolduan, John Avlon and Harry Enten produced a podcast called The Forecast Fest together. It was about the 2020 United States presidential election.

References

External links
CNN Profiles: Harry Enten
The Forecast Fest on stitcher

1988 births
21st-century American journalists
21st-century American non-fiction writers
American bloggers
American male bloggers
American male journalists
American podcasters
American political writers
American statisticians
CNN people
Dartmouth College alumni
Jewish American journalists
Journalists from New York City
Living people
Mathematicians from New York (state)
Online journalists
People from Riverdale, Bronx
The Guardian journalists
Writers from the Bronx
Riverdale Country School alumni
21st-century American Jews